× Aegilotriticum erebunii is a herbaceous flowering plant in the grass family. It is a natural hybrid which has been found in Armenia in the Caucasus.

Taxonomy 
This nothospecies was first described as a species, Triticum erebuni, in 1984 by P.A. Gandilyan in the bulletin of the Vavilov Institute, but in a 1994 paper published by Wageningen University, Michiel van Slageren identified it as an intergeneric hybrid, and moved the taxon to × Aegilotriticum.

References 

Flora of Armenia
Pooideae
Plant nothospecies